The 1988 Kentucky Wildcats football team represented the University of Kentucky in the 1988 NCAA Division I-A football season. The Wildcats scored 217 points while allowing 208 points.  This was Jerry Claiborne's seventh season as Kentucky's head coach.  The Wildcats finished 5–6, one victory shy of bowl eligibility; the highlight of the season was an upset of #11 ranked Georgia.

Season
Kentucky opened with a win against Central Michigan, then lost at #7 Auburn and Indiana before beating Kent State.  Losses to #12 Alabama and at #19 LSU followed.  Next were wins against #11 Georgia, Southern Illinois and Vanderbilt, then losses to Florida and at Tennessee.

The victory over Georgia was the season's high point.  Running back Alfred Rawls, a Georgia native, had 128 yards and a touchdown rushing and linebacker Randy Holleran had 13 tackles; #11 Georgia was held to 224 yards of total offense.

Schedule

Team players in the 1989 NFL Draft

References

Kentucky
Kentucky Wildcats football seasons
Kentucky Wildcats football